Semalea atrio, the small silky skipper, is a butterfly in the family Hesperiidae. It is found in Sierra Leone, Ivory Coast, Ghana, Nigeria, Cameroon, the Central African Republic, the eastern part of the Democratic Republic of the Congo and north-western Tanzania. The habitat consists of primary forests.

References

Butterflies described in 1891
Erionotini
Butterflies of Africa